is an  mountain located in the city of Komaki, Aichi Prefecture, Japan. At one point, the mountain was topped with the original Komakiyama Castle, built by Oda Nobunaga. The mountain is now a historical park, containing various castle ruins, including water wells and stone walls, in addition to artifacts dating further back. Though known for the sakura trees, the northern part of the mountain is home to many Machilus thunbergii trees. This is the only spot in the surrounding area where these trees occur naturally. The reproduction of Komakiyama Castle was built in 1967 and houses the Komaki City Historical Museum.

Komakiyama Castle
 was a Sengoku period yamashiro-style Japanese castle located in what is now part of the city of Komaki, Aichi prefecture. It was built by the warlord Oda Nobunaga to facilitate his conquest of Mino Province, later reused by Tokugawa Ieyasu is his struggle for hegemony over Toyotomi Hideyoshi. Its ruins have been protected as a National Historic Site since 1927.

Background
The isolation of the location meant that the castle had a good view in all directions. The castle consisted of many terraces on a steep hillside, protected by stone walls and dry moats, with the inner bailey on the summit, crowned by a tenshu.

History 
After Oda Nobunaga defeated Imagawa Yoshimoto at the Battle of Okehazama in 1560, securing his eastern borders, he turned his attention to the conquest of Mino Province to the north. He built a castle on Mount Komaki in 1563 as his base of operations due to its proximity to the middle and eastern areas of Mino. Nobunaga succeeded in securing Mino by 1567 and transferred his seat to Inabayama Castle (the future Gifu Castle) in 1567 and then turned his attention to the conquest of the Kansai region to the west, abandoning Komakiyama Castle.

After Nobunaga's assassination in 1582, conflict arose between his son Oda Nobukatsu and his leading general Toyotomi Hideyoshi. Nobukatsu allied with Tokugawa Ieyasu and seized Owari Province, while Hideyoshi held on to Mino Province. Hideyoshi's general Ikeda Tsuneoki crossed the Kiso River and occupied Inuyama Castle. To counter this move, Tokugawa Ieyasu occupied and expanded the vacant Komakiyama Castle. Both sides clashed in a series of largely inconclusive battles known collectively as the  Battle of Komaki and Nagakute. The stalemate ended when Ieyasu decided to submit to Hideyoshi, which resulted in his withdrawal to Mikawa Province, and Komakiyama Castle was once again abandoned.

In the Edo period, Owari Province came back under the control of the Tokugawa clan, and Komakiyama Castle was retained by Owari Domain as a secondary fortification for use in emergencies, as it retained the shape of its original fortifications.  By the time of the Meiji restoration, these fortifications were largely in ruins. The site was donated by the Tokugawa family to the local government in 1930 and became a park. A faux tenshu was recreated on the summit in 1967 and renovated in 2006. The building was modeled after the Hiunkaku Pavilion of the temple of Nishi Hongan-ji in Kyoto and is thus not a historically accurate reconstruction. It houses the Komaki City Historical Museum with examples of samurai armor, Japanese swords and early firearms, roof tiles, and other artifacts uncovered during excavations in the castle grounds.

The site is a 20 minutes walk from Meitetsu Komaki Line Komaki Station.

See also
List of Historic Sites of Japan (Aichi)

References

Literature

External links 

 Komaki city tourist information office
 Komaki Castle at Jcastle Guide

Castles in Aichi Prefecture
Ruined castles in Japan
History of Aichi Prefecture
1560s establishments in Japan
Komaki
Historic Sites of Japan
Museums in Aichi Prefecture
History museums in Japan
Owari Province
Komaki
Parks in Aichi Prefecture